P. marginatus may refer to:
 Paracoccus marginatus, the papaya mealybug
 Phlebopus marginatus, the Salmon gum mushroom

See also